The United States of Anxiety is a political and history podcast hosted by Kai Wright that focuses on racial justice in the United States.

Background 
The podcast began as a reaction to the political polarization of the 2016 American election. The podcast focuses on the history of racism in America. The podcast discusses school segregation and its continuing effects in American education. In 2020, the podcast received a permanent spot on New York Public Radio's radio schedule.

Reception 
The Atlantic included the show on their list of "The 50 Best Podcasts"  in 2016, 2017, and 2018. The podcast received the 2017 New York Press Club Award for its coverage of the presidential race. The show also won the 2018 NYSAPA award.

References

External links 
 

Audio podcasts
Political podcasts
History podcasts
2018 podcast debuts
American podcasts